Bramwell is a surname derived from an unidentified hamlet in England, the name of which comes from the Old English for 'broom' or 'bramble well'. The location of the place it referred to is difficult to trace, as the surname is distributed fairly evenly throughout England. In modern times, 'Bramwell' has also been used as a masculine given name, with the short form 'Bram'. A variant form of this name is 'Branwell' and another possible meaning is "raven's well".

People surnamed Bramwell
 Aaron Bramwell (born 1986), Welsh rugby union player
 Sir Byrom Bramwell (1847–1931), British brain surgeon
 Christopher Bramwell (fl. 1977–1996), British television actor
 David Bramwell, British writer, musician, performer and broadcaster
 David Bramwell (1942–2022), British botanist.
 Edwin Bramwell (1873–1952), Scottish neurologist
 Sir Frederick Bramwell (1818–1903), British civil and mechanical engineer
 George Bramwell, 1st Baron Bramwell (1808–1892), English judge
 Grant Bramwell (born 1961), New Zealand sprint canoeist
 Henry Bramwell (1919–2010), United States federal judge
 John Bramwell (born 1964), English singer and songwriter
 John Crighton Bramwell (1889–1976), British cardiologist
 John Milne Bramwell (1852–1925), Scottish physician and surgeon
 John Bramwell (footballer) (born 1937), English football left back
 Steven T. Bramwell (born 1961), British physicist and chemist

People with the given name Bramwell
 Bramwell Booth (1856–1929), English General of The Salvation Army
 Bramwell Fletcher (1904–1988), English stage, film and television actor
 Bramwell Tillsley (born 1931), Canadian General of The Salvation Army
 Bramwell Tovey (born 1953), British conductor and composer

References

English toponymic surnames
English masculine given names